Ethan is a town in Davison County, South Dakota, United States. It is part of the Mitchell, South Dakota Micropolitan Statistical Area. The population was 365 at the 2020 census. Ethan is located 10 miles south of Mitchell.

Geography

Ethan is located at  (43.545878, -97.983283).

Ethan has been assigned the ZIP code 57334.

History
Ethan was laid out in 1883, and named in honor of Ethan Allen, a patriot in the Revolutionary War.

Demographics

2010 census
As of the census of 2010, there were 331 people, 130 households, and 92 families residing in the town. The racial makeup of the town was 97.9% White, 1.2% Native American, and 0.9% from two or more races. Hispanic or Latino of any race were 0.3% of the population.

There were 130 households, of which 36.2% had children under the age of 18 living with them, 55.4% were married couples living together, 11.5% had a female householder with no husband present, 3.8% had a male householder with no wife present, and 29.2% were non-families. 24.6% of all households were made up of individuals, and 10% had someone living alone who was 65 years of age or older. The average household size was 2.55 and the average family size was 3.01.

The median age in the town was 33.9 years. 28.4% of residents were under the age of 18; 8.5% were between the ages of 18 and 24; 29.1% were from 25 to 44; 19.8% were from 45 to 64; and 14.2% were 65 years of age or older. The gender makeup of the town was 50.2% male and 49.8% female.

2000 census
As of the census of 2000, there were 330 people, 129 households, and 91 families residing in the town. The population density was 1,350.6 people per square mile (530.9/km2). There were 138 housing units at an average density of 564.8 per square mile (222.0/km2). The racial makeup of the town was 99.09% White, 0.61% from other races, and 0.30% from two or more races. Hispanic or Latino of any race were 0.91% of the population.

There were 129 households, out of which 38.8% had children under the age of 18 living with them, 59.7% were married couples living together, 9.3% had a female householder with no husband present, and 28.7% were non-families. 24.8% of all households were made up of individuals, and 12.4% had someone living alone who was 65 years of age or older. The average household size was 2.56 and the average family size was 3.08.

In the town, the population was spread out, with 30.0% under the age of 18, 8.5% from 18 to 24, 29.1% from 25 to 44, 19.1% from 45 to 64, and 13.3% who were 65 years of age or older. The median age was 33 years. For every 100 females, there were 89.7 males. For every 100 females age 18 and over, there were 86.3 males.

The median income for a household in the town was $37,917, and the median income for a family was $43,125. Males had a median income of $30,208 versus $19,688 for females. The per capita income for the town was $14,897. About 6.4% of families and 8.4% of the population were below the poverty line, including 7.9% of those under age 18 and 26.3% of those age 65 or over.

References

External links
 Ethan Voice

Towns in Davison County, South Dakota
Towns in South Dakota
Mitchell, South Dakota micropolitan area